The City of Glasgow is divided into a number of wards. These electoral districts, as they are also known, are used to elect councillors to Glasgow City Council. The council, composed of the elected members from each ward, provides local government services to the City of Glasgow.

There are 23 wards situated within the perimeters of Glasgow City Council. Each one elects 3 or 4 councillors every five years in the Scottish local council elections. The most recent elections were held in 2022.

Glasgow City Council is one of the 32 council areas for Scotland (each council containing a number of wards). The boundaries for all Scottish council areas and their sub divisional wards are regulated and regularly reviewed by the Local Government Boundary Commission for Scotland.

Map 
The following is a map of the current party representation for each ward, shown within the area served by Glasgow City Council.

List of Wards (2017) 
The following is a list of each Glasgow ward and its population data.

Previous ward systems

2007 to 2017 multi-member wards
Prior to the introduction of the 2017 boundaries, a similar multi-member system divided among 21 wards was introduced for the 2007 council election, also used in 2012:

1995 to 2007 single-member wards
From 1999 until the 2007 election, there were 79 councillors elected from 79 small single-member wards by the plurality (first past the post) system of election. The result from this system in 2003 was 69 of the 79 councillors representing the Labour Party, although that party gained only around half the votes cast in the election to the council, and the Scottish National Party represented by just four councillors, despite gaining some 20% of the votes. There were also three Liberal Democrat councillors, one from the Conservative party, and one from the Scottish Socialist Party.

The earlier election returns were even more skewed in terms of seats versus overall vote share due to the voting system in use: in 1999 council election result, Labour received 74 seats (94%) from 49% of the vote and the SNP received two seats from 29% vote share. In the first GCC election in 1995, which included 83 wards, Labour won 77 (93%) of the seats from approximately 62% of the overall vote, while the SNP's 23% overall vote share gave them only one seat.

Wards list (1999 and 2003 elections)

See also
Demography of Glasgow
Politics of Glasgow
Subdivisions of Scotland

References

 
Politics of Glasgow
Glasgow